Ernst Bernhard Sehring (1 June 1855 in Edderitz, Anhalt – 27 December 1941) was a German architect.

Life 
Sehring came from a petty-bourgeois village background and was the son of a Dessau construction foreman. He was boarded by Professor Happach and attended the Gymnasium and the Kunstschule in Dessau. From 1873 until 1875, he studied at the Technische Universität Braunschweig, then architecture four semesters at the Berlin Bauakademie. In 1877/1878, he was a trainee with the architect Karl Hoene in Halle (Saale). Sehring completed his year of military service as a one-year volunteer in 1878/1879. He undertook a study trip to Italy in 1879/1880 to observe the theatre architecture and garden architecture there.

In 1883, he received the Großer Akademischer Staatspreis.

As a state scholarship holder in Rome (1883 and 1884), he took part in an international theatre building competition for the first time and opened the architectural firm Peters and Sehring with Ernst Peters in Berlin-Kreuzberg in 1885. In 1889, he terminated this partnership and from 1890 was active as an independent, freelance artist and architect.

Sehring became known for his designs, especially competition designs, theatre and other new buildings. At the Theater des Westens in Berlin-Charlottenburg, he combined an elegant neo-baroque auditorium with a stage tower in the style of a medieval keep. Sehring later adopted a similar combination of disparate styles in the construction of the Stadttheater Halberstadt as well as the Düsseldorfer Schauspielhauses (both in 1905). At first, he even ran the Theater des Westens himself together with his partner Paul Blumenreich as Theater des Westens GmbH; however, the attempt was financially unsuccessful.

Buildings and drafts
 1889–1890: Künstlerhaus St. Lukas in Berlin, Fasanenstraße 13 (unter Denkmalschutz)
 1890–1895: Wohnhaus Kantstraße 153 in Berlin-Charlottenburg (erster Wohnsitz von Rudolf Diesel)
 1891(?): Königin-Luise-Gedächtnishalle in Neustrelitz
 1892: Mehrfamilienwohnhaus-Paar in Berlin, Carmerstraße 10/11
 1895–1896: Theater des Westens in Berlin-Charlottenburg, Kantstraße
 1895–1896: Westtürme der St. Jakob, Köthen in Köthen (Anhalt)
 1895–1896: Theater „Alt-Berlin“ auf der Berliner Gewerbeausstellung 1896 in Berlin-Treptow (abgebrochen 1897)
 1899–1900: Fassade des Warenhauses der H. & C. Tietz AG in Berlin, Leipziger Straße 46–49 (im Zweiten Weltkrieg zerstört)
 1901: Walpurgishalle auf dem Hexentanzplatz bei Thale (Harz)
 1902–1904: Stadttheater in Bielefeld, Niederwall 27 (innen 1937 verändert, 2004–2006 denkmalgerecht saniert)
 1903–1904: Villa Löwenpalais in Berlin-Grunewald, Koenigsallee 30/32 (unter Denkmalschutz)
 1904–1905: Schauspielhaus in Düsseldorf, Kasernenstraße (im Zweiten Weltkrieg zerstört)
 1904–1905: Stadttheater in Halberstadt (im Zweiten Weltkrieg zerstört)
 1905: Bismarck-Brunnen in Breslau, Schlossplatz / Königsplatz
 1906–1910: Stadthalle / Musikhalle in Görlitz, Am Stadtpark 1
 1907–1908: Stadttheater (heutiges Staatstheater) in Cottbus, Schillerplatz
 1907–1920: Roseburg castle in Ballenstedt, Sehrings Sommersitz
 before 1914: Expansion of Reisen  castle
 before 1914: Reconstruction of the Berlin Wintergarten theatre in Berlin, Friedrichstraße
 1927–1928: Kino Delphi-Palast in Berlin-Charlottenburg, Kantstraße / Fasanenstraße (Heavily damaged in the Second World War, façade and garden design reconstructed)

References

Further reading 
 Ralph Berndt: Bernhard Sehring und die Roseburg. Ein Ensemble des Späthistorismus im Harz. In  (1/1999), .

External links 

 Biografie und Werkverzeichnis Sehrings auf den Internetseiten der Roseburg, retrieved 15 June 2021

19th-century German architects
20th-century German architects
Theatre architects
1855 births
1941 deaths
People from Saxony-Anhalt
19th-century German military personnel